Viviz (stylized in all caps) is a South Korean girl group formed by BPM Entertainment. The group consists of former GFriend members: Eunha, SinB, and Umji. The group debuted on February 9, 2022, with their first extended play Beam of Prism.

Name
The group's name, Viviz, is an abbreviation of the phrase "Vivid dayZ", which brings together the concepts of "clear, intense, and days", defined by the agency as "the meaning of becoming artists who always proudly express their own colors to the world." In addition, its Korean pronunciation is "bi-bi-ji", refers to the names of the three members: Eunha (Jung Eun-bi), SinB (Hwang Eun-bi) and Umji.

Career

2021–present: Introduction and debut with Beam of Prism, Queendom 2 participation and Summer Vibe

On October 6, 2021, it was announced that Eunha, SinB, and Umji, who were former members of GFriend, had signed with BPM Entertainment and would be debuting as a three-member group. On October 8, the group name was announced as Viviz.

On January 24, 2022, BPM Entertainment announced the group would be making their debut on February 9, 2022, with the release of their first extended play Beam of Prism. Following the extended play's release, they made their broadcast debut on Mnet's M Countdown on February 10. On February 16, exactly a week since their debut, the group won their first music show award on MBC M's Show Champion. On February 21, Mnet announced that Viviz would be participating in the second season of the Mnet reality competition show Queendom, finishing in third place in the finals.

On April 26, Viviz appeared on Grammy's Global Spin — a video series by The Recording Academy highlighting unique artists from around the globe. They performed their debut lead single "Bop Bop!" at the Dongdaemun Design Plaza in Seoul. The trio were the first ever K-pop girl group to feature on the series.

On June 23, BPM Entertainment announced Viviz would be releasing their second extended play titled Summer Vibe on July 6.

On October 21, Universe announced Viviz will be releasing single "Rum Pum Pum" on October 27 for its "Universe Music" series.

On January 5, 2023, BPM Entertainment announced that Viviz would release their third extended play titled Various on January 31.

Members

 Eunha
 SinB
 Umji

Discography

Extended plays

Singles

Other charted songs

Videography

Music videos

Filmography

Television shows

Awards and nominations

Notes

References

 
BPM Entertainment artists
K-pop music groups
South Korean girl groups
South Korean pop music groups
Women's musical groups
Musical groups from Seoul
2022 establishments in South Korea
Musical groups established in 2022
South Korean musical trios